Minor league baseball teams were based in Frankfort, Kentucky in various seasons between 1885 and 1916. Frankfort teams played as members of the Interstate League in 1885, the Blue Grass League from 1908 to 1912 and Ohio State League in 1915 and 1916. Frankfort won Blue Grass League championships in 1908 and 1912.

History
Frankfort began hosting minor league baseball play in 1885, when the Frankfort team played as members of the six–team Interstate League. Shenkel was the Frankfort manager. The 1885 standings are unknown.

In 1908, the "Frankfort Statesmen" became charter members of the Class D level Blue Grass League and won the league championship. Frankfort finished the regular season in first with a record of 47–23, playing under manager Neal Kennedy. The league had no playoffs and Frankfort finished 9.0 games ahead of the 2nd place Lexington Colts in the six–team league. The charter teams were Frankfort (47–23), Lawrenceburg Distllers (33–35), Lexington Colts (37–31), Richmond Pioneers (36–34), Shelbyville Millers (32–37) and Versailles Aristocrats/Winchester Reds (22–47). The Frankfort team was also known as the "Lawmakers" in some references. Both monikers reflect Frankford as the State Capitol of the state of Kentucky.

Continuing play in the 1909 Blue Grass League, the Frankfort Statesmen ended the season in fourth place. Frankfort had a final record of 56–60, finishing 17.5 games behind the first place Winchester Hustlers, playing under managers Neal Kennedy and Ben Marshall.

The 1910 season saw the team finish in fifth place in the Class D level Blue Grass League. The Frankfort Statesmen finished with a 60–61 record and were 17.0 games behind the first place Paris Bourbonites. Wallace Warren and Danny Harrell managed the 1910 Frankfort Statesmen.

In the 1911 Blue Grass League season the Frankfort Statesmen finished with a record of 48–65 The team placed fifth and finished 22.0 games behind the first place Paris Bourbonites under manager Ed Coleman. Frankfort's Ovid Nicholson stole 111 bases and scored 128 runs. The next stolen base league leader had 54. Nicholson was called up by the Pittsburgh Pirates after the conclusion of the Frankfort season.
 
The 1912 Frankfort Lawmakers won the Blue Grass League championship in the final season of the league. With a 85–42 record under manager Ollie Gfroerer in the final standings, Frankfort finished in first place. Following Frankfort were the Lexington Colts (60–65), Maysville Rivermen (82–47), Paris Bourbonites (60–69), Richmond Pioneers (66–64) and Mt. Sterling Orphans (31–97). The Blue Grass League folded following the 1912 season and Frankfort was unable to defend their championship.

Frankfort resumed minor league play in 1915. Frankfort became members of the Class D level Ohio State League. The Frankfort Old Taylors began play in the six–team league and finished the 1915 season in fourth place with a 45–65 record. The Old Taylors finished 24.5 behind the first place Portsmouth Cobblers, while playing under managers Pat Bohannon and Jack Hayden.

The "Old Taylors" moniker was in reference to local industry, as Frankfort was home to the Old Taylor Distillery Company. The 1916 Ohio State League members were the Charleston Senators (58–63), Chillicothe Babes/Huntington/Maysville Angels (58–55), Frankfort Old Taylors (45–65), Ironton Nailers (47–69), Lexington Colts (63–48 )and Portsmouth Cobblers (71–42).

In their final season of play, the 1916 Frankfort Old Taylors folded during the season. On July 6, 1916, Frankfort folded with a 24–35 record under manager James "Ducky" Holmes. The Ohio State League permanently folded on July 16, 1916.

Frankfort, Kentucky has not hosted another minor league team.

The ballpark
The name of the Frankfort teams' home ballpark are not known. The campus of Kentucky State University at Alumni Field and State Stadium were venues in use in the era.

Timeline

Year-by-year records

Notable alumni

Eddie Bacon (1915)
Jack Bellman (1885)
Bill Cramer (1910–1912)
Dick Crutcher (1908–1909)
Ed Glenn (1909)
Ernie Gust (1912)
Ducky Holmes (1916, MGR)
Jim McLaughlin (1885)
Ed Monroe (1915)
Ovid Nicholson (1911–1912)
George Yantz (1909)

See also
Frankfort (minor league baseball) playersFrankfort Lawmakers playersFrankfort Old Taylors playersFrankfort Statesmen players

References

External links
 Frankfort - Baseball Reference

Minor league baseball history
Baseball in Kentucky
Baseball by city